Vincent J. Graber Sr. (May 17, 1931 – July 2, 2014) was an American politician.

Background
Born and raised in South Buffalo, New York, he went to South Park High School and then served in the United States Army in 1952. In 1954, Graber worked for South Buffalo Railway Company and then lived in West Seneca, New York. After he left the New York Assembly, Graber represented clients in Albany, New York. He died in Wilmington, North Carolina from cancer.

Political career
He entered politics as a Democrat, and served on the West Seneca Town Board. He was a member of the New York State Assembly from 1975 to 1994, sitting in the 181st, 182nd, 183rd, 184th, 185th, 186th, 187th, 188th, 189th and 190th New York State Legislatures. He sponsored the seat belt plan that passed the New York legislature in 1984.

References

1931 births
2014 deaths
Politicians from Buffalo, New York
Democratic Party members of the New York State Assembly
Seat belts